The 2009 Monterrey Open was a tennis tournament played on outdoor hard courts. It was the first edition of the Monterrey Open and was categorized as an International tournament on the 2009 WTA Tour. It took place at the Sierra Madre Tennis Club in Monterrey, Mexico, from March 2 through March 8, 2009.

The tournament included four players who were ranked in the top 20: Agnieszka Radwańska; Marion Bartoli, the 2009 Brisbane runner-up; Flavia Pennetta, the 2009 Acapulco runner-up; and Zheng Jie. Also in the field were Ágnes Szávay; Iveta Benešová, the 2009 Hobart runner-up and a 2009 Acapulco semifinalist; Gisela Dulko, the 2009 Bogotá runner-up; and Maria Kirilenko.

Entrants

Seeds

Rankings as of March 2, 2009.

Other entrants
The following players received wildcards into the main draw:
 Melissa Torres Sandoval
 Urszula Radwańska
 Magdaléna Rybáriková
The following players received entry via qualifying:
 Lenka Wienerová
 Michaëlla Krajicek
 Vania King
 Arantxa Rus

Finals

Singles

 Marion Bartoli defeated  Li Na 6–4, 6–3
It was Marion Bartoli's first title of the year and 4th overall.

Doubles

 Nathalie Dechy /  Mara Santangelo defeated  Iveta Benešová /  Barbora Záhlavová-Strýcová 6–3, 6–4

External links
Official website

Monterrey Open
Monterrey Open
2009 in Mexican tennis